West Asian Athletics Championships are an athletics event organised by the West Asian Athletics Championships Association and contested by 13 nations of Western Asia. The inaugural event took place in 2010 in Aleppo, Syria.

Editions

Participating nations

See also
West Asian Games
Asian Athletics Championships
Maghreb Athletics Championships

References

Athletics competitions in Asia
Recurring sporting events established in 2010
International athletics competitions
Athletics in the Arab world